Revisionism in Irish historiography refers to a historical revisionist tendency and group of historians who are critical of the orthodox view of Irish history since the achievement of partial Irish independence, which comes from the perspective of Irish nationalism. For opponents, Revisionists are regarded as apologists for the British Empire in Ireland, proponents of a form of denialism and even in some cases advocates of neo-unionism, while the Revisionists on the other hand see themselves as positing a progressive cosmopolitan narrative opposed to a "narrowly sectarian" viewpoint.

History
The revisionist school of Irish history can be said to have originated in the 1930s when it was championed by Robert Dudley Edwards, D. B. Quinn and T. W. Moody.

Themes

Figures
Brendan Bradshaw, Fellow and Director of Studies in History at Queens' College, Cambridge, stated that there has been an "iconistic assault" on nationalist martyrs. Examples include Ruth Dudley Edwards' criticisms of Patrick Pearse and Tom Dunne's criticism of Wolfe Tone in his book Theobald Wolfe Tone: Colonial Outsider.

Patrick Pearse and the Provisional IRA
One trend is to link the violence of people like Patrick Pearse and the Easter rebels to the violence of the Provisional IRA by saying Pearse provided a template for the ideology of the Provisionals.

The President of the Republic of Ireland Michael D. Higgins has criticised this calling it "loose revisionism" and "tendentious". He followed up: “This was of course a somewhat simplistic and ideological assumption, and contemporary historians are more interested in the human rights breaches and the political and social basis of conflict and exclusion as a source of violence in the Northern Ireland of the 1970s.”

Historians and other writers

Revisionists
 Ian Adamson
 Donald Akenson
 Jonathan Bardon
 Owen Dudley Edwards
 Robert Dudley Edwards
 Ruth Dudley Edwards
 Marianne Elliott
 Richard English
 Garret FitzGerald
 R. F. Foster
 Eoghan Harris
 Peter Hart
 Liam Kennedy
 Michael Laffan
 F. S. L. Lyons
 Martin Mansergh
 F. X. Martin
 Theodore William Moody
 Kevin Myers
 Conor Cruise O'Brien
 Cormac Ó Gráda
 Fintan O'Toole
 Tom Reilly
 Tom Dunne

Anti-Revisionist
 Aubane Historical Society
 Revd Dr Brendan Bradshaw
 Tim Pat Coogan
 Anthony Coughlan
 Seamus Deane
 Desmond Fennell
 Meda Ryan
 Kevin Whelan (historian)

See also
 Anglophilia
 Post-colonialism
 West British

References

Notes

External links
 The Revisionist Debate in Ireland at Project Muse
 Beyond Revisionism, Reassessing the Great Irish Famine at History Ireland

 
Historiography of Ireland
Historiography of the British Empire
Unionism in the United Kingdom
Irish nationalism